The 2006–07 Southern Professional Hockey League season was the third season of the Southern Professional Hockey League.  The regular season began October 27, 2006, and ended April 18, 2007, after a 56-game regular season and a six-team playoff.  The Fayetteville FireAntz won their first SPHL championship.

Preseason
The Richmond Renegades joined the league as an expansion franchise, succeeding the United Hockey League's Richmond RiverDogs.

Regular season

Final standings

‡  William B. Coffey Trophy winners
 Advanced to playoffs

The Florida Seals folded mid-season after not meeting contractual obligations to their arena.  A one-round dispersal draft was held January 5, with each team choosing one player from the Seals' roster.  The picks were as follows: Pee Dee - Justin Keller, Jacksonville - Lawne Snyder, Fayetteville - Rob Sich, Richmond - Matt Balser, Columbus - Chad Haacke, Knoxville - Craig Geerlinks, Huntsville - Craig Miller.

Attendance

President's Cup playoffs

(1) Columbus Cottonmouths vs. (6) Jacksonville Barracudas

The Columbus Cottonmouths and the Jacksonville Barracudas play at best of 5 round that will take the place of the first two playoff rounds.  The other four teams will play a best of 3 game Quarter-final and Semi-final round.

Quarter-finals
Note: game-winning goal scorer indicated in italics

(2) Knoxville Ice Bears vs. (5) Richmond Renegades

(3) Fayetteville FireAntz vs. (4) Huntsville Havoc

Semi-finals
Note: game-winning goal scorer indicated in italics

(2) Knoxville Ice Bears vs. (3) Fayetteville FireAntz

Finals

Awards
SPHL award winners were announced March 28, 2007.

All-Star selections

References

Southern Professional Hockey League seasons
South